Mount St. Michael Secondary School is an all-girls voluntary secondary school, under the trusteeship of the Catholic Education an Irish Schools Trust (CEIST), on the outskirts of Claremorris in County Mayo, Ireland. Located on what was the estate of Denis Browne (local landlord), it was founded in 1906 and began as a 'Secondary Top' in 1924. It developed into a full secondary school in 1940.

Until 2000, the school accommodated both residential and day pupils. Boarders were first admitted in 1906 and the annual intake numbered 15 between 1906 and 1940. This number increased to 90 until 1996 when the phasing out of the boarding school was begun. The 1999-2000 academic year was the final year in which the school accommodated boarding (residential) students. As of 2018, school had an enrollment of approximately 450 students.

In 1987, a board of management was set up, comprising representatives of trustees, teachers and parents. In 1990 a lay principal was appointed.

Mount St. Michael operates a 6-year program covering the Junior Cycle and Senior (Leaving Certificate) Cycle.

References

Girls' schools in the Republic of Ireland
Secondary schools in County Mayo